This article concerns the period 129 BC – 120 BC.

References